Flanders Fields is a common English name of the World War I battlefields in an area straddling the Belgian provinces of West Flanders and East Flanders as well as the French department of Nord-Pas-de-Calais, part of which makes up the area known as French Flanders.

Description
The name Flanders Fields is particularly associated with battles that took place in the Ypres Salient, including the Second Battle of Ypres and the Battle of Passchendaele. For most of the war, the front line ran continuously from south of Nieuwpoort on the Belgian coast, across Flanders Fields into the centre of Northern France before moving eastwards — and it was known as the Western Front.

The phrase was popularized by a poem, "In Flanders Fields", by Canadian Lieutenant-Colonel John McCrae which was inspired by his service during the Second Battle of Ypres.

See also 
 Flanders Field American Cemetery and Memorial
 In Flanders Fields Museum
 Lange Max Museum
 Red poppy
 La leggenda del Piave

Notes

External links
 

Western Front (World War I)
World War I sites in Belgium
World War I sites in France